Tovdalselva (also known as the Tofdalselva, Tovdalsåna, Tovdalsåni, literally: the Tov valley river) is  long and is one of the longest rivers in Southern Norway. The river flows through Agder county from the mountains on the northeast side of the Setesdal valley in Valle municipality southwards, until it reaches the sea at the Tofdalsfjorden between Hamresanden and Kjevik in Kristiansand. The upper reaches of the river include many lakes such as the Herefossfjorden and the Straumsfjorden (the largest lake on the river). The drainage basin includes parts or all of the following municipalities: Fyresdal, Valle, Bygland, Evje og Hornnes, Åmli, Froland, Grimstad, Birkenes, Iveland, Lillesand, and Kristiansand.

Fishing
Tovdalselva was long considered one of the greatest salmon fishing rivers in the land. From 1880 to 1883, it was Norway's third most productive salmon river, calculated both by weight and by value of the salmon caught. This had decreased seriously by the 1900s. By 1970, the salmon fishing in the Tovdalselva was almost completely lost.

References

Geography of Kristiansand
Rivers of Agder
Rivers of Vestfold og Telemark